Evangelia Micheli-Tzanakou (March 22, 1942 – September 24, 2012) was a professor of biomedical engineering and the Director of Computational Intelligence Laboratories at Rutgers University. Dr. Micheli-Tzanakou was also a Founding Fellow of the American Institute for Medical and Biological Engineering (AIMBE), a Fellow of the Institute of Electrical and Electronics Engineers (IEEE), and a Fellow of the New Jersey Academy of Medicine. Dr. Micheli-Tzanakou's areas of interest included neural networks, information processing in the brain, image and signal processing applied to biomedicine, telemedicine, mammography, hearing aids and electronic equivalents of neurons.  Dr. Micheli-Tzanakou received international attention in 1974 when she established the first Brain to Computer Interface (BCI) using her algorithm ALOPEX. This method was used in the study of Parkinson's disease. The ALOPEX algorithm has also been applied toward signal processing, image processing, and pattern recognition. Dr. Micheli-Tzanakou died on September 24, 2012, after a long fight with cancer.

Books

Awards 
 Meritorious Achievement Award, Institute of Electrical and Electronics Engineers, 2010. Micheli-Tzanakou's citation reads "for vision and leadership in establishing the IEEE Biometrics Certification Program." 
 Meritorious Service Award, Institute of Electrical and Electronics Engineers - CIS, 2006.
 New Jersey Women of Achievement Award, 1995. "For the application of neural networks to engineering in medicine and biology".
 Achievement Award of the Society of Women Engineers, 1992
 Outstanding Advisor Award, Institute of Electrical and Electronics Engineers (IEEE), 1985.

Education 

 B.S. Physics, University of Athens, Greece, 1968
 M.A. Physics, Syracuse University, 1974
 Ph.D. Physics, Syracuse University, 1977

References

Further reading
 Tzanakou was honored in 2000 by this listing as an "Innovator" on the IEEE homepage.
 Each year in March, the IEEE honors several women members; Micheli-Tzanakous was one of five selected in 2004.

American bioengineers
2012 deaths
Rutgers University faculty
Syracuse University alumni
National and Kapodistrian University of Athens alumni
Women bioengineers
1942 births
Fellows of the American Institute for Medical and Biological Engineering
Fellow Members of the IEEE
People from Athens